Mistresses is an American drama television series, which premiered on ABC on June 3, 2013. This is an adaption by K.J. Steinberg, of the 2008-10 U.K. series of the same name. The series stars Alyssa Milano, Rochelle Aytes, Yunjin Kim, Jes Macallan, Jennifer Esposito and Tabrett Bethell, as a close group of female friends whose lives are complicated by illicit and complex relationships and situations. On September 9, 2016, ABC cancelled the series after four seasons.

A total of 52 episodes of Mistresses had aired over four seasons.

Series overview

Episodes

Season 1 (2013)

Season 2 (2014)

Season 3 (2015)

Season 4 (2016)

Ratings

References

External links
 
 

Mistresses (American TV series)
Mistresses (American TV series)